The Danish Realm, officially the Kingdom of Denmark, is a sovereign state located in Northern Europe and Northern North America. It consists of metropolitan Denmark—the kingdom's territory in continental Europe and sometimes called "Denmark proper"—and the realm's two autonomous regions: the Faroe Islands and Greenland. The relationship between the three parts of the Kingdom is also known as The unity of the Realm.

The Kingdom of Denmark is not a federation; similar to the Realm of New Zealand, it is a concept encompassing the three autonomous legal systems of Denmark, the Faroe Islands and Greenland, united under its monarch. The Kingdom of Denmark is a unitary sovereign state. It has Arctic territorial claims in the Arctic Ocean: various sites near the North Pole (Lomonosov Ridge, Gakkel Ridge, Alpha-Mendeleev Ridge complex, and the Chukchi Borderland). Constitutionally, the Kingdom of Denmark encompasses the realm, but the Faroe Islands and Greenland have an extended degree of autonomy to govern their relations.

The Faroe Islands and Greenland have been under the Crown of Denmark since 1397 (de facto) when the Kalmar Union was ratified, and part of the Danish Realm since 1814 (de jure). However, due to their separate historical and cultural identities, these parts of the Realm now have an extensive degree of self-government and have assumed legislative and administrative responsibility in a substantial number of fields.

Legal matters in the Realm are subject to the Constitution of the Realm of Denmark. It stipulates that it applies for all parts of the Kingdom of Denmark and that legislative, executive and judicial powers are the responsibility of the Parliament of the Kingdom of Denmark, the Government of Denmark and the Supreme Court of Denmark. The Faroe Islands were granted home rule via an independence referendum in 1946, and Greenland did so in a 1979 referendum. In 2005, the Faroes received a self-government arrangement, and in 2009 Greenland received "self rule", thus leaving the government of Denmark with little influence over the matters of internal affairs that are devolved to the local governments of Greenland and the Faroe Islands.

Name 
The sovereign state that holds sovereignty over the Realm of Denmark is named "Kingdom of Denmark".

The Danish term , translated as "The unity of the Realm", the "commonwealth of the Realm", or the "Danish Commonwealth" refers to the constitutional status of the relationship between Denmark, the Faroe Islands, and Greenland. The name was used by Danish and Greenlandic authorities in the negotiations for home rule introduced in 1979, and has become popular since the beginning of the 1990s. The acts establishing the 1948 Faroese home rule and the 1979 Greenlandic home rule use the term rigsenheden instead. Jurist Frederik Harhoff argued in 1993 that rigsenheden should be replaced with rigsfællesskabet, as the former implies a common identity, while the latter implied a community of different identities. The use of the expression Rigsfællesskabet though can be traced back to at least 1908.

Population and area 

Denmark's population is by far the largest of the three; 5.8 million people live in Denmark, and about 52,000 and 56,000 in the Faroe Island and Greenland, respectively. In comparison, there are ten cities in Denmark with a population above 50,000 people. Denmark is populated by the Danes, the Faroe Island by the Faroese, and Greenland by the Greenlandic Inuit. In both the Faroe Islands and Greenland, Danes make up 7.6% of the population, . , there are about 11,000 Faeroese-born and 17,000 Greenlandic-born people living in Denmark.

With respect to area, Greenland is by far the largest, and makes up 98% of the realm. Denmark alone has an area of about 43,000 km2, and is no. 133 on that list. Denmark is situated in Northern Europe and is flat and arable, the Faroe Islands in the Northern Atlantic and are rugged with cliffs along the coast, while Greenland is in the North Atlantic and Arctic, and is 79% covered in ice. Greenland is the most sparsely populated territory in the world, according to the World Bank.

The Kingdom has submitted five claims to the United Nations that its exclusive economic zone extends beyond the usual 200 nautical miles limit: one north and one south of the Faroe Islands, and three around Greenland. One Greenlandic claim includes the North Pole and the Lomonosov Ridge, and extend all the way to the Russian exclusive economic zone. Claims overlapping with other nation's claims has to be resolved through negotiation; in 2019, Iceland, Norway and the Kingdom of Denmark settled their claims to the area north of the Faroe Islands.

The Kingdom was in a dispute with Canada on who has sovereignty over Hans Island between 1978 and 2022. The two governments eventually settled on a border running approximately halfway through the island.

Historical background 

The Faroe Islands were settled by Norwegian Vikings in the 9th century, displacing Irish monks already there. Iceland was settled in the 9th century by Norsemen, and was a free state until 1262/1264, when it came under Norwegian taxation. Greenland, already populated by the indigenous Greenlandic Inuit, was settled by Norwegians in the 10th century, among those Erik the Red. The connection to Greenland was lost in the 15th century, but Denmark–Norway again established connections in 1721 though the missionary Hans Egede.

In 1814, Denmark ceded Norway to Sweden under the Treaty of Kiel, but kept control of the Faroe Islands, Greenland, and Iceland. The colonies on Greenland were situated on the west coast, and as a condition for the sale of the Danish West Indies to the United States in 1917, the U.S. recognised Danish sovereignty over the whole island, and most countries followed suit. One exception was Norway who in 1931 occupied parts of East Greenland, but abandoned their claim in 1933, when it lost the case at the Permanent Court of International Justice.

In Iceland there were a growing nationalism in the 19th century, and Iceland was in 1874 given its own constitution and increased autonomy, but still with the executive power in Danish hands. Iceland was granted home rule in 1904, and, by the Danish–Icelandic Act of Union, full independence in 1918. The act established a personal union between Denmark and the newly created Kingdom of Iceland, with Denmark handling coastal protection and foreign affairs. In 1944, Iceland abolished the personal union and adopted a new constitution that established the current republic, after a referendum on the subject. This happened during World War II, where Denmark and Iceland were cut off from each other, as Denmark was occupied by Germany, and Iceland by the United States.

The Faroe Islands were made a Danish county in 1816, and with the constitution of 1849, it gained representation in the Rigsdag. During World War II, the Faroe Islands were occupied by the United Kingdom and they largely administrated themselves. After the war, it was clear that the old system could not be reinstated. In an independence referendum in 1946, 50.7% of the Faeroese voted for independence, but the result was rejected by the Danish government. Instead, after negotiations between the Faroe Islands and Denmark, the Faroe Islands were granted "home rule" in 1948.

Greenland was originally administrated as two separate colonies, viz. North and South Greenland. In 1950, these two were merged as the Colony of Greenland. Following the constitutional reform in 1953, Greenland was incorporated into Denmark as a county and given representation in the Folketing. When Denmark joined the European Communities (EC) in 1972, Greenland followed, despite 70% of the Greenlandic voters voted against it in the referendum. As a home rule agreement would allow them to leave again (the Faroe Islands did not join the EC), this was an important factor in the increasing support for home rule. Another factor was a desire to make Greenland more Greenlandic and less Danish. They were given home rule in 1979 and left the EC in 1985. Under the home rule agreement, Greenland gradually took over more responsibility from the Danish state. In 2009, the home rule was replaced with "self rule", granting greater autonomy.

Constitutional status
The Danish constitution also applies in the Faroe Islands and Greenland, as section one states that it "shall apply to all parts of the Kingdom of Denmark". The sovereignty of the Faroe Islands and Greenland is held by the Danish state. The Kingdom of Denmark is a unitary state, with the Folketing being its unicameral legislature. The Faroe Islands and Greenland each elect two members to the parliament; the remaining 175 members are elected in Denmark.

Home rule and self rule 
The Folketing have by law given the Faroe Islands and Greenland extensive autonomy; the Faroe Islands were given "home rule" in 1948, and Greenland in 1979. Greenland's home rule was replaced in 2009 by "self rule". There is an ongoing legal debate about what constitutional weight these arrangements have. In general, there are two conflicting views: (a) the laws delegate power from the Folketing and can be revoked unilaterally by it, and (b) the laws have special status so changes require the consent of the Faeroese Løgting or the Greenlandic Inatsisartut, respectively.

Proponents of the first interpretation include Alf Ross, Poul Meyer, and Jens Peter Christensen. Ross, the chief architect of the Faeroese home rule, compared it to an extended version of the autonomy of municipalities. Meyer wrote in 1947, prior to the Faeroese home rule, that if power was delegated as extensive in other parts of the country, it would probably breach section 2 of the 1915 constitution, suggesting it did not do that here due to the Faroe Islands' separate history. Similarly, Christensen, a Supreme Court judge, said that due to the special circumstances, the scope of delegation need not be strictly defined.

Proponents of the second interpretation include Edward Mitens, Max Sørensen and Frederik Harhoff. Mitens, a Faeroese jurist and politician, argued that the Faeroese home rule had been approved by both the Løgting and the Rigsdag, so it was an agreement between two parties, in particular because the approval by the Løgting happened according to special rules put in place in 1940 with the consent of the Danish representative there, during the occupation by the United Kingdom. Sørensen said the intention with the Faeroese home rule was that it should not be unilaterally changed, as stated in the preamble, so it had that effect. Harhoff, in his 1993 Doctorate dissertation, considered the home rule acts of the Faroe Islands and Greenland to be somewhere in between the constitution and a usual act by the Folketing, as it had been treated as such.

Greenlandic independence 

The Greenlandic self rule act of 2009 gives Greenland a way to achieve independence. First, the Greenlandic people must make the decision, after which there should be negotiations between the Greenlandic government (Naalakkersuisut) and the Danish government about how to practically implement it. The agreement reached needs to be ratified by Inatsisartut, and approved in a referendum in Greenland. It also needs consent from the Folketing, in accordance with section 19 of the Danish constitution. That section states that any changes to the Kingdom's territory needs to be approved by the Folketing. Greenlandic independence does not require a constitutional change; instead, should Greenland become independent, the rules in the constitution regarding Greenland becomes void.

With regards to international law, Denmark signed the Indigenous and Tribal Peoples Convention in 1996 and acknowledged the Greenlandic Inuit as an indigenous people. In the 2009 self rule act, Denmark recognised the Greenlandic people as a "people" within the context of international law, and their inherent right to self-determination.

Devolved powers

The Kingdom of Denmark constitutes a unified sovereign state, with equal status between its constituent parts. Devolution differs from federalism in that the devolved powers of the subnational authority ultimately reside in central government, thus the state remains de jure unitary.

The Self-Government Arrangements devolves political competence and responsibility from the Danish political authorities to the Faroese and the Greenlandic political authorities. The Faroese and Greenlandic authorities administer the tasks taken over from the state, enact legislation in these specific fields and have the economic responsibility for solving these tasks. The Danish government provides an annual grant to the Faroese and the Greenlandic authorities to cover the costs of these devolved areas.

The 1948 "Home Rule Act of the Faroe Islands" sets out the terms of Faroese home rule. The Act states, "...the Faroe Islands shall constitute a self-governing community within the State of Denmark." It establishes the home government of the Faroe Islands (Landsstýrið) and the Faroese parliament, the Løgting. More significantly, the Act specifies the powers devolved from the Government of Denmark, including: local government and municipal affairs; taxation, at a local and territorial level; public services, including police and town planning; welfare services, such as housing; primary and secondary education; Archives, libraries, museums; agriculture and fishing; entertainment; among other areas. The Faroe Islands were previously administered as a Danish county (amt); the Home Rule Act abolished the post of Amtmand (County Governor) and replaced it with the role of Rigsombudsmand (High Commissioner of the Danish government). These powers were expanded in a 2005 Act, which named the Faroese home government as an "equal partner" with the Danish government.

The 1978 "Greenland Home Rule Act" devolves powers in much the same way as the Faroese Home Rule Act. It sets out a home rule government and Greenlandic parliament. Specific areas of governance specified in the act include: Organization of local government; Fishing and agriculture; Welfare system; protection of the environment; other areas affecting Greenlanders directly, etc.

On 21 June 2009, Greenland assumed self-determination with responsibility for self-government of judicial affairs, policing, natural resources, immigration and border controls. Also, Greenlanders were recognised as a separate people under international law. Greenland is now described as having "self rule", with its home government exercising a wider range of powers.

There are a number of matters that can not be acquired by the territories; Constitutional affairs, foreign policy, defence, the Supreme Court, citizenship, and monetary policy. Additionally, the Faroese and Greenlandic parliaments are subordinate to the Danish parliament, where the two territories are represented by two seats each (from a total of 179 seats).

The Faroe Islands have gradually taken control of more and more areas of responsibility according to their Home Rule Act from 1948. The Faroese/Danish act of 2005 states: "This law is based on an agreement between the Governments of the Faroe Islands and Denmark as equal partners."

Foreign affairs 

Previously, most foreign relations were undertaken exclusively by the Government of Denmark on behalf of the entire realm, but more recently the Faroe Islands and Greenland have increased their role in foreign policy. Representatives for both have joined Danish delegations in discussions on some international matters, such as fishing rights. Greenlandic representatives were included in the process of a new treaty between Denmark and the US regarding the Thule Air Base in northwest Greenland.

The Kingdom of Denmark as a whole is a member of the United Nations, NATO, the OECD and the World Trade Organization. The Faroe Islands and Greenland are associated members of the Nordic Council in their own right as part of Denmark's membership. Although the Kingdom of Denmark is a member of the European Union, both areas have special dispensation and remain outside the EU. Greenland joined the EU as part of Denmark in 1973, but opted to leave in 1985 after Greenlandic home rule was introduced in 1979.

The "Home Rule Act of the Faroe Islands" specifies that a 'Faroese' shall be understood to mean a person who is a "national of Denmark and a resident of the Faroe Islands". The Government of Denmark issues special passports for its citizens living in the Faroe Islands and Greenland with the right to choose a regular Danish passport as well. The Faroese Home Rule Act states that, in Faroese passports, Føroyingur (Faroese) and Føroyar (Faroe Islands) shall be inserted after the words Dansk (Danish) and Danmark (Denmark).

Not devolved 
The provisions for home rule are limited to internal matters only. Neither Greenland nor the Faroe Islands can write laws that concern the relationship with other states, nor laws that apply to the entire Realm; furthermore, the Supreme Court (Danish: Højesteret) in Copenhagen is the final legal instance, and legal matters from Greenland and the Faroe Islands must be prepared for that court, like any Danish matter. Danish currency is also legal tender in Greenland, but not in the Faroes. Denmark is responsible for the military defence of both nations.

Relationship with the European Union 
The Kingdom of Denmark is a member state of the European Communities, the predecessor of the European Union, since 1973. In 1982, Greenland voted to leave the Communities after gaining home rule from the Realm of Denmark. The Faroe Islands was never part of the EU, as explicitly asserted by both Rome treaties. The relations of the Faroe Islands with the EU are governed by a Fisheries Agreement (1977) and a Free Trade Agreement (1991, revised 1998). The main reason for remaining outside the EU is disagreements about the Common Fisheries Policy.

Terminology 
  Meaning "home rule", it indicates an autonomous administration (present in both in Greenland and the Faroe Islands) that has power over many internal affairs. In this arrangement, the Danish government deals with external matters such as defence and foreign affairs. Greenland and the Faroe Islands maintain their own elected assemblies and administrations, headed by a premier who appoints a cabinet. This is synonymous with "self-governing".

  Following a referendum on 25 November 2008 (the 30th anniversary of the establishment of home rule in Greenland), the relationship between the Danish and Greenlandic governments changed, with Greenland gaining greater autonomy. Further powers were granted to the Greenlandic government on 21 June 2009, including control of the police force, coastguard, and courts. Additionally, Greenland now receives fewer Danish subsidies, becoming more self-sufficient. As a result of these changes, Greenland was then said to have self rule with minimal support from Denmark, as opposed to "home rule".

  High Commissioners represent the interests of Denmark in the Faroe Islands and Greenland. There is one Danish High Commissioner in each territory. The commissioner can attend the meetings at the Løgting in the Faroes and at the Inatsisartut in Greenland, but can't vote.

  Members of the Folketing from the Faroe Islands and Greenland: Greenland and the Faroe Islands and their self-rule administrations take part in consultations on policies and decisions affecting their region, including negotiations with the devolved legislatures and the Danish parliament (folketing). Greenland and the Faroe Islands have two members of the Danish  each, with full voting privileges.

See also 

 Constitution of Denmark
 Faroese independence movement
 Greenlandic independence movement
 Icelandic independence movement
 Kingdom of Iceland
 Kingdom of Norway (1814)
 List of High Commissioners of Greenland
 List of High Commissioners of the Faroe Islands

Literature 
 Adriansen, Inge (2003): Nationale symboler i Det Danske Rige 1830–2000, Vol I (Fra fyrstestat til nationalstater), Museum Tusculanum Press, University of Copenhagen. 
 Adriansen, Inge (2003): Nationale symboler i Det Danske Rige 1830–2000, Vol II (Fra undersåtter til nation), Museum Tusculanum Press, University of Copenhagen.

Notes

References

Sources 
 The Danish Constitution for the Danish Realm: Danmarks Riges Grundlov, no. 169 of 5 June 1953.

Further reading

External links

General 
 The unity of the Realm; the status the Faroe Islands and Greenland (Prime Minister's Office)
 Tourism portal at VisitDenmark.
 Tourism portal at VisitGreenland.
 Tourism portal at VisitFaroeIslands.

Government 
Denmark:
 Stm.dk – official Danish government website
 um.dk  – official Ministry of Foreign Affairs of Denmark website
 Statistics Denmark (DST) – Key figures from the Danish bureau of statistics
 

Faroe Islands:
 Government.fo – official Faroese government website
 Government.fo – official Ministry of Foreign Relations of the Faroe Islands website
 Statistics Faroe Islands (FST) – Key figures from the Faroese bureau of statistics
 

Greenland:
 Naalakkersuisut.gl – official Greenlandic government website
 Naalakkersuisut.gl – official Ministry of Foreign Relations of Greenland website
 Statistics Greenland (GST) – Key figures from the Greenlandic bureau of statistics

News and media 
 Google news The unity of the Realm
 Google news Kingdom of Denmark – term used to include Greenland and the Faroe Islands
 Google news Danish Realm

 
Politics of Denmark
Government of Denmark
Government of the Faroe Islands
Government of Greenland